The 2011–12 B-Meg Llamados season was the 24th season of the franchise in the Philippine Basketball Association (PBA).

Key dates
August 28: The 2011 PBA Draft took place in Robinson's Place Ermita, Manila.

Draft picks

Roster

Philippine Cup

Eliminations

Standings

Bracket

Quarterfinals

B-Meg vs. Powerade

Commissioner's Cup

Eliminations

Standings

Seeding playoffs

Bracket

Quarterfinals

B-Meg–Meralco series

Semifinals

Barangay Ginebra–B-Meg series

Finals

Governors Cup

Eliminations

Standings

Semifinals

Standings

Finals berth playoff

Finals

Transactions

Trades

Pre-season

Philippine Cup

Additions

Subtractions

Recruited imports

References

Magnolia Hotshots seasons
B-Meg